Ana Paula Mello (born 10 October 1961) is a Brazilian volleyball player. She competed in the women's tournament at the 1980 Summer Olympics.

References

1961 births
Living people
Brazilian women's volleyball players
Olympic volleyball players of Brazil
Volleyball players at the 1980 Summer Olympics
Sportspeople from Belo Horizonte